Bora saul  is a variety of glutinous rice found in Assam, India. It has an important role in Assam and for Indigenous Assamese. During traditional occasions like Bihu, this variety of rice is eaten with served with Doi (curd), Gur (Jaggery) and Cream.

Bora saul is different from the rice consumed in mainland India and is more aligned with the type of sticky rice consumed in Southeast Asian cuisine. One variation of bora saul is kola (black) bora saul, or black sticky rice.

Bora saul is used in various other Assamese dishes, such as Jolpan (snacks) and Pitha (rice cake or pancake). Boiled bora saul is served as Jolpan with curd or milk, jaggery or sugar. Soaked and ground bora saul  is used in preparing Pitha.

Some local Assamese entrepreneurs are also experimenting with using bora saul to create commercially available rice-based alcoholic brews.

References

Indian rice dishes
Rice varieties
Assamese cuisine